In-young is a Korean unisex given name. Its meaning differs based on the hanja used to write each syllable of the name. There are 29 hanja with the reading "in" and 34 hanja with the reading "young" on the South Korean government's official list of hanja which may be used in given names.

People with this name include:
Yi In-yeong, Korean Empire military figure, led a Righteous Army attack on the Japanese garrison in Seoul in 1907
Choi In-young (born 1962), South Korean male footballer
Hwang In-young (born 1978), South Korean actress
Park Inyoung (born 1982), South Korean female singer
Seo In-young (born 1984), South Korean female singer
Yoo In-young (born Yoo Hyo-min, 1984), South Korean actress
Hong In-young (born 1985), South Korean actress
Song In-young (born 1990), South Korean male footballer

See also
List of Korean given names

References

Korean unisex given names